Madvar may refer to:
 Madvar, Kerman
 Madvar, Yazd